Anna Manaut Caixal (born 17 December 1990) is a Spanish handball player  for AS Cannes Handball and the Spanish national team.

In 2016 she left the Spanish league to sign for the French team ESBF Besançon.

Achievements 
Youth European Championship:
Finalist: 2007

References

1990 births
Living people
Spanish female handball players
People from Segarra
Sportspeople from the Province of Lleida
Handball players from Catalonia
Expatriate handball players
Spanish expatriate sportspeople in France
21st-century Spanish women